Francisco Solis or Solís may refer to:
 Francisco Solis (athlete), Dominican Republic middle-distance runner
 Francisco Solis (judoka), Chilean judoka

 Francisco Solís (bishop), Roman Catholic prelate
 Francisco Arias Solís, Spanish politician